Digor or Digorian (дигорон digoron) is a dialect of the Ossetian language spoken by the Digor people. It is less widely spoken than Iron, the other extant Ossetian dialect. The two are distinct enough to sometimes be considered separate languages; in the recently published Digor–Russian dictionary, the compiler Fedar Takazov refers to a "Digor language", though the editor in the same book uses "Digor dialect". Until 1939, Digor had a literary language separate from Iron.

Digorian speakers live in the western part of North Ossetia (Digora, Chikola, etc.); in North Ossetia's capital, Vladikavkaz; and in larger cities of Russia. Counts of speakers are largely nonexistent, because Digorians are mostly calculated as Ossetians during census.

See also
 Ossetians
 North Ossetia–Alania
 Digor people

References 

Ossetia
Eastern Iranian languages
Languages of Russia
Ossetian language